Panther Creek Township is one of eleven townships in Cass County, Illinois, USA.  As of the 2020 census, its population was 306 and it contained 149 housing units.

Geography

Cities, towns, villages
 Chandlerville (southeast half)

Unincorporated towns
 Anderson
 Palmerton
 Sylvan (historical)
 Panther Creek (historical) It is indicated on an 1839 map as a town that is east of present-day Chandlerville on what is now known as Chandlerville Road. The 1839 road was a sulky road; a sulky is a carriage seating only one person.
(This list is based on USGS data and may include former settlements.)

Cemeteries
The township contains these four cemeteries: Allendale, Bell, Chandlerville City and Pontiac.

Major highways
  Illinois Route 78

Landmarks
 Panther Creek Conservation Area (east quarter)
 Panther Creek State Wildlife Refuge

Demographics
As of the 2020 census there were 306 people, 75 households, and 55 families residing in the township. The racial makeup of the township was 96.08% White, 0.00% African American, 0.33% Native American, 1.63% Asian, 0.00% Pacific Islander, 0.33% from other races, and 1.63% from two or more races. Hispanic or Latino of any race were 0.33% of the population.

There were 75 households, out of which 20.00% had children under the age of 18 living with them, 69.33% were married couples living together, 4.00% had a female householder with no spouse present, and 26.67% were non-families. 24.00% of all households were made up of individuals, and 12.00% had someone living alone who was 65 years of age or older. The average household size was 2.19 and the average family size was 2.56.

The township's age distribution consisted of 11.6% under the age of 18, 4.3% from 18 to 24, 17.7% from 25 to 44, 51.9% from 45 to 64, and 14.6% who were 65 years of age or older. The median age was 51.1 years. For every 100 females, there were 110.3 males. For every 100 females age 18 and over, there were 113.2 males.

The median income for a household in the township was $100,156, and the median income for a family was $120,313. Males had a median income of $51,181 versus $51,071 for females. The per capita income for the township was $45,945. No families and 1.2% of the population were below the poverty line.

School districts
 A C Central Community Unit School District 262
 Virginia Community Unit School District 64

Political districts
 Illinois' 18th congressional district
 State House District 93
 State Senate District 47

References
 
 United States Census Bureau 2007 TIGER/Line Shapefiles
 United States National Atlas

External links
 City-Data.com
 Illinois State Archives

Townships in Cass County, Illinois
Townships in Illinois
1923 establishments in Illinois